St. Francis Xavier Forane Church is at the center of Velur, Kerala, India. It is a  Syro-Malabar Catholic Church, and a protected monument in the Archdiocese of Thrissur with considerable antiquity and spiritual heritage. Historically this Forane church has been the mother church of many parishes. Four Forane divisions have come into existence out of this church.

The church's founder, Fr. Johann Ernst Hanxleden, who is popularly known as Arnos Padiri, wrote the first Malayalam – Portuguese Encyclopedia  He was a Jesuit priest from Germany. It is believed that the Velur church was founded on 3 December 1712 in honor of St. Francis Xavier.

References

External links 
 Official Instagram
 Syro Malabar website
 Official site
 The Hindu News Paper
 Puthen Pana
 Arnos Pathiri 
 India Book of Records 

Archdiocese of Thrissur
Churches in Thrissur district
Churches completed in 1712